Stonewalling is a refusal to communicate or cooperate.  Such behaviour occurs in situations such as marriage guidance counseling, diplomatic negotiations, politics and legal cases.  Body language may indicate and reinforce this by avoiding contact and engagement with the other party. People use deflection in a conversation in order to render a conversation pointless and insignificant. Tactics in stonewalling include giving sparse, vague responses, refusing to answer questions, or responding to questions with additional questions. Stonewalling can be used as a stalling tactic rather than an avoidance tactic.

Politics
In politics, stonewalling is used to refuse to answer or comment on certain questions about policy and issues, especially if the committee or politician in question is under investigation. Stonewalling in politics and business can sometimes create a critical advantage. William Safire wrote that stonewalling was originally used in Australian cricket, but its use during president Richard Nixon's Watergate affair brought it into usage in American politics as a "refusal to comment".
Stonewalling can also be seen as filibustering, or stalling the passage of bills until they become outdated or changed when engaging in parliamentary procedures.

Relationships
When one or both members of a couple refuse to communicate, this can mark the final step in the breakdown of their relationship. John Gottman characterised this stage as the fourth horseman in his Cascade Model of Relational Dissolution. In his studies, "stonewalling" was overwhelmingly done by men, with women overwhelmingly using "criticism". In his studies, men's physiology reached a state of arousal before "stonewalling", while the female partner showed a physiological reaction of increased heart rate after her partner had "stonewalled" her. Gottman goes into detail on The Four Horsemen in his book, "The Seven Principles of Making a Marriage Work".

As stonewalling persists in a relationship and becomes a continuous cycle, the negative effects of stonewalling outweigh the positive effects, it then becomes the greatest predictor of divorce in a marriage. When one or both partners in a relationship stonewall, their ability to hear each other or listen to each other's disagreement, concern, side or argument, reduces their ability to engage and help address the situation. Stonewalling can be detrimental to relationships because there is often no chance for resolution of conflict. 

When stonewalling occurs, it has both a physiological and psychological effect on the person who is stonewalling. Physiologically, the person who is stonewalling can completely shut down, particularly when it is used as a self-soothing mechanism. The person doing stonewalling may be aware or unaware that this is taking place, because of an increase in adrenaline due to an increase in stress, where the person can either engage or flee the situation. Because stonewalling is a physiological reaction, the stonewalling can be thought of as a fight or flight response. Psychologically, stonewalling is a defense mechanism for preserving one's self and emotions. 

Other signs of stonewalling are silence, mumbling monotone utterances, changing the subject and physically removing oneself from the situation (e.g., leaving the room).

Witnesses
Witnesses in court or other legal actions may refuse to cooperate with a counsel by withholding information and refusing to testify. Prosecutors may try to break their united front by offering incentives such as immunity from prosecution. Another tactic of stonewalling is to provide the jurors with misleading information or withhold possibly self-incriminating information. When witnesses use the stonewalling practice, they are usually in an agreement with other witnesses to do the same in order for the tactic to be effective.

See also

Cold shoulder
Dumb insolence
Filibuster
Obstructionism
Passive aggression
Running out the clock
Send to Coventry
Silent treatment
Social rejection
Spiral of silence

References

Human behavior
Social psychology
Shunning
Silence